Damia may refer to:

Damia (novel) (1992) by Anne McCaffrey
Damia, Jordan
 Damia, Greek goddess of fertile earth.
 Damia, the stage name of French singer Marie-Louise Damien (1889–1978)
Damià, or Damià Abella, a former Spanish footballer.
 Damia, one of the Original Seven Dragoons in the video game The Legend of Dragoon